Brahmrishi Bawra Shiksha Niketan Senior Secondary School is a school in Street Number 6, Chandigarh Rd, Karam Colony, Beantpura, Hira Nagar, Ludhiana, Punjab.

About School 
This school is established in 1998

References

Education in Ludhiana